The Timurid dynasty, self-designated as Gurkani, was a culturally Persianate Sunni Muslim dynasty or clan of Turco-Mongol origin descended from the warlord Timur (also known as Tamerlane). The word "Gurkani" derives from "Gurkan", a Persianized form of the Mongolian word "Kuragan" meaning "son-in-law". This was an honorific title used by the dynasty as the Timurids were in-laws of the line of Genghis Khan, founder of the Mongol Empire, as Timur had married Saray Mulk Khanum, a direct descendant of Genghis Khan. Members of the Timurid dynasty signaled the Timurid Renaissance, and they were strongly influenced by Persian culture and established two significant empires in history, the Timurid Empire (1370–1507) based in Persia and Central Asia, and the Mughal Empire (1526–1857) based in the Indian subcontinent.

Origins

The origin of the Timurid dynasty goes back to the Mongol tribe known as Barlas, who were remnants of the original Mongol army of Genghis Khan, founder of the Mongol Empire. After the Mongol conquest of Central Asia, the Barlas settled in what is today southern Kazakhstan, from Shymkent to Taraz and Almaty, which then came to be known for a time as Moghulistan – "Land of Mongols" in Persian – and intermingled to a considerable degree with the local Turkic and Turkic-speaking population, so that at the time of Timur's reign the Barlas had become thoroughly Turkicized in terms of language and habits.

Additionally, by adopting Islam, the Central Asian Turks and Mongols adopted the Persian literary and high culture which had dominated Central Asia since the early days of Islamic influence. Persian literature was instrumental in the assimilation of the Timurid elite into the Perso-Islamic courtly culture.

List of rulers

Timurid Empire

 Abu Sa'id's sons divided Transoxiana upon his death, into Samarkand, Bukhara, Hissar, Balkh, Kabul and Farghana.

Mughal Empire

See also
 Timur
 Timurid Empire
 Mughal Empire
 Turco-Mongol
 List of Turkic dynasties and countries
 List of Mongol states
 Borjigin
 List of Sunni Muslim dynasties

References and notes

Further reading
 BĀYSONḠORĪ ŠĀH-NĀMA in Encyclopædia Iranica
 Elliot, Sir H. M.; edited by Dowson, John. The History of India, as Told by Its Own Historians. The Muhammadan Period; published by London Trubner Company 1867–77. (Online Copy: The History of India, as Told by Its Own Historians. The Muhammadan Period; by Sir H. M. Elliot; Edited by John Dowson; London Trubner Company 1867–1877 — This online copy has been posted by: The Packard Humanities Institute; Persian Texts in Translation; Also find other historical books: Author List and Title List)

External links

 Timurid Dynasty
 Virtual Art Exhibit

 
Mongol dynasties
Turkic dynasties
History of Central Asia
History of South Asia